"I Done It My Way" is an episode of the BBC sitcom, The Green Green Grass. It aired on 19 February 2009, as the seventh episode of the fourth series. This episode acted as a 'clip show' for both Only Fools and Horses and The Green Green Grass. In total, the episode contained around forty clips, some of which were made specially for this episode. When series 4 was released on DVD, both separately, as well as part of a box set, the episode was left out, because of the archive clips. Even digital comedy channel Gold refuse to show the episode because of this, and is not available to watch on any catch-up services, including BBC iPlayer.

Synopsis
With a microphone and a tape recorder, Boycie recalls the big issues in his life in what he intends to be a classic – a life manual and an important book for future generations. Boycie's story begins as he recalls his Peckham days, with flashback memories to his South London life with Del Boy, Rodney and the rest of the gang. He fondly remembers his friendships, their adventures, the subsequent move to Shropshire and his new life on the farm. His memories of the old days proves surprisingly enlightening for him and hilarious for Marlene.

Episode cast

Archive Appearances  (In order of appearance)

Production, broadcast and reception

Broadcast
This episode was broadcast on 19 February 2009.

DVD release
The UK DVD has been released for Series 4 but does not include this episode for copyright reasons, because of the archive clips used.

Clip list
The following list of clips is from the episode I Done It My Way. The information displayed below is taken from the original broadcast of the episode.

Block A
A Rocky Start – Boycie and Marlene are chased by Rocky.
The Jolly Boys' Outing – The coach explodes during the beano to Margate.
Hay Fever – Bryan, Boycie and Elgin side off the trailer as it glides into a pot hole.
Miami Twice – Boycie, Marlene, Del and Rodney escape the Mafia.
Testing Times – Boycie has lost all his hair.

Block B
Big Brother – Del tries to flog some dodgy suitcases that he bought off Trigger.
Little Problems – The Driscoll Brothers buy everybody a drink, for less than a pound.
A Losing Streak – Del beats Boycie at poker, but who's cheating?
Sleepless in Peckham – Del and Rodney accuse Boycie of murdering Marlene.
May The Force Be With You – Slater arrests Del over a dodgy microwave oven.

Block C
From Here to Paternity – Ray punches Boycie.
Chain Gang – Boycie is punched during a scene in a cafe.
From Here to Paternity – Colin punches Boycie.

Block D
Keep on Running – Denzil tells Boycie of the Driscoll Brothers' release.

Block E
Keep on Running – Boycie tells Marlene that they're moving.
Keep on Running – Driving to Oakham, Shropshire.
Keep on Running – Venturing across their land.
Keep on Running – Venturing into the local pub for the first time.
The Country Wife – Llewellyn shots at something as the gate Boycie is climbing over collapses.
A Rocky Start – Boycie wakes up face to face with Rocky the Bull.
The Special Relationship – Boycie and Marlene are splattered with muck.
The Country Wife – It is revealed that Rocky is a gay bull.
One Flew Over the Cuckoo Clock – Tyler, Imelda and Marlene talk on the sofa.
Unknown episode – Elgin talks to Boycie about his wife.
If You Go Down to the Woods – Boycie, Bryan and Jed wander through the woods, lost.
One Flew Over the Cuckoo Clock – Tyler, Imelda and Marlene continue to talk.

Block F
Strangers on the Shore – Denzil and Trigger talk in his lorry cab.
Watching the Girls Go By – Del and Rodney talk women whilst on a night out.
Strangers on the Shore – Denzil and Trigger continue to talk.

Block G
The Final Curtain – Boycie is fretting over the fact that all his male family have died prematurely.
Homesick – Grandad lays still, now bed bound or is he?
The Final Curtain – Boycie continues fretting.

Block H
New footage – Boycie has developed a phobia – of vegetables.
New footage – Boycie discusses his problems in bed with Marlene.
New footage – Marlene arranges for the Doctor to help Boycie. (The next five clips are intercut with this clip)
Strangers on the Shore – Boycie is suffering after Del put onion puree in his hair gel.
Strangers on the Shore – 'Gary' tracks the smell of onions to Boycie.
Strangers on the Shore – Boycie asks Denzil if he can smell onions.
Strangers on the Shore – Del puts the onion puree in Boycie's hair gel.
Strangers on the Shore intercut with new footage – Del tells Marlene what he's done over the phone.

Block I
Heroes and Villains – Del and Rodney charge into the wake dressed as Batman and Robin.
Lust in Translation – Bryan goes into the pub all dressed up and grabs the wrong woman.
Stage Fright – Raquel sings with Tony Angelino who cannot pronounce his R's.
Danger UXD – Del and Rodney throw the dolls into a ditch just before they explode.

References

External links
British TV Comedy Guide for The Green Green Grass
BARB viewing figures

2009 British television episodes
The Green Green Grass episodes